The DR Class V 60 was a class of 0-8-0 diesel-hydraulic locomotives of the Deutsche Reichsbahn intended for medium to heavy shunting service.

In addition to being used by the DR, the locomotives were also found in service on various works and mine railways. About 25 per cent were exported to Comecon countries, and the so-called Non-Socialist Economic Area (Nichtsozialistisches Wirtschaftsgebiet, NSW). For example, the Egyptian State Railways, the Bulgarian State Railways (BDŽ) and Algerian National Railways (SNTF) all received this type of locomotives.

Prototypes 
Based on the requirements, LKM Babelsberg built a four-axle prototype locomotive with an asymmetrically arranged driver's cab and drive via a jackshaft and coupling rods. A turbocharged eight-cylinder 8 KVD 21 A engine from VEB Motorenwerk Johannisthal was used. The testing of the prototype V 60 1001 began on 5 February 1959. In September 1959, the second prototype V 60 1002 followed.

With 2,256 units, the design in one of the most frequently built European standard gauge locomotives. 188 locomotives were built by LKM in Babelsberg, the remainder by LEW in Hennigsdorf.

Class 347 

In 1986, the last major transport project in East Germany was the new Mukran Ferry Port in Sassnitz. The port was primarily used to provide a trouble-free connection between East Germany and the former Soviet Union. In 1989, five train ferries ran in regular service between Mukran and Klaipėda in Lithuania.

Livery 
In the first series, the original paintwork was red with white stripes; later, the DR painted all shunting locomotives yellow. When this the paint got a bit older and dirtier, the then golden-brown paint was reminiscent of a grilled chicken. There, locomotives in this colour were given the nickname Goldbroiler.

References

External links 

 Triebfahrzeug-Lexikon auf DB-Loks.de
 Die V 60D-Familie in aller Welt

 

Diesel-hydraulic locomotives of Germany
V 060
Railway locomotives introduced in 1959
Standard gauge locomotives of Germany
LEW locomotives
LKM locomotives